Seyyed Ahmadi (also Romanized as Seyyed Aḩmadī) is a village in Qeshlaq Rural District, in the Central District of Khorrambid County, Fars Province, Iran. At the 2006 census, its population was 142, in 33 families.

References 

Populated places in Khorrambid County